Spanish Chileans refer more often to Chileans of post-independence Spanish immigrant descent, as they have retained a Spanish cultural identity. People of pre-independence Spanish descent are usually not considered Spanish Chileans even though they form a large majority of the Chilean population and have Spanish surnames and ancestry. This is because they rejected Spanish identity for the emergent Chilean one on the eve of national independence.

History 
The earliest European immigrants were Spanish colonisers who arrived in the 16th century. They came to form the majority of the population by the time of Chilean independence. They came mainly from Castile and Andalusia and formed the majority population. The Amerindian population of central Chile was absorbed into the Spanish settler population in the beginning of the colonial period to form the large mestizo population that exists in Chile today; mestizos create modern middle and lower classes. In the 18th and 19th centuries, many Basques from both Spain and France came to Chile where they integrated into the existing elites of Castilian origin. Other European nationalities then followed and also became rich and fused with each other and the Basque-Castilian elite to create modern middle and upper classes. At the beginning of the Guano era in 1840s, one of Peru's most prosperous time periods, immigration from Spain greatly increased and the economy was booming and standard of living was high. This era ended in 1866 with the Chincha Islands War wherein anti-Spanish sentiments in Peru also arose in Chile and in which Peru emerged victorious. In 1903, a fleet of 88 Canarian families—400 persons—arrived in Budi Lake, that currently have more than 1,000 descendants, as a response to the government's call to populate this region and signed contracts for the benefit of a private company. While many Canarians obeyed their servitude, some of those who disobeyed the provisions of repopulation tried to escape their servitude and were arrested, and the indigenous Mapuche people took pity on the plight of these Canarians who were established on their former lands. The Mapuches welcomed them and joined their demonstrations in the so-called "revolt of the Canarians", and many Canarians integrated into Mapuche population to add the large mestizo population that exists in Chile. In the 20th century, there was an influx of refugees of the Spanish Civil War and Franco's regime.(see Winnipeg ship) They have kept their Spanish national identity and set up Spanish clubs throughout the country. The Spanish culture of the original settlers slowly evolved into Chilean folk culture, especially the huaso one, and at the time of independence had abandoned national affiliation with Spain.

Spanish architecture in Chile 

Today, most Chileans have predominantly Spanish/Basque ancestry. However, unlike most other Spanish-American countries, very few buildings were built by Spaniards during the colonial period. One or two colonial buildings from the later stage of Spanish domination might still be standing in a few cities in central Chile. However, there are two small towns in Chile whose city centre is dominated by Spanish architecture, Cobquecura, near Concepcion, and Yerbas Buenas, near Linares. Because of this exception to the rule, they are protected by the Chilean government as 'places of architectural heritage'. Most houses are American in style, while the old public buildings are French and the newer ones are based on American skycrapers.

Notable Spanish Chileans
 Isabel Allende, writer
 Alejandro Amenábar, film director
 Manuel Blanco Encalada, 1st (provisional) President of Chile (1826), Vice-Admiral in the Chilean Navy
 Matías Cousiño, coal magnate and patriarch of the Cousiño family
 Carlos Díaz, television and film actor
 Javiera Díaz de Valdés, actress
 Karen Doggenweiler Lapuente, journalist, TV hostess
 Roberto Matta, abstract expressionist and surrealist painter
 Jorge Montt, 12th president of Chile (1891–1896), vice-admiral of the Chilean navy
 Carlos Pezoa Véliz, writer
 José Piñera, businessman and politician
 Sebastián Piñera, businessman and President of Chile (2010-2014 and 2018-2022)
 Arturo Prat, Navy officer and national hero
 Carlos Prats, Former Army Commander in Chief
 José Joaquín Prieto, Army General and President of Chile (1831-1841)
 Germán Riesco, President of Chile (1901-1906)
 Carolina Tohá, politician
 José Tohá, politician
 Leonor Varela, actress

List of Spanish cultural centres and other institutions in Chile
They have regional cultural centres in Santiago and other large cities.

 7ª. Cía. de Bomberos "Bomba España", Antofagasta
 Centro Español de Antofagasta
 Sociedad Española de Beneficencia de Antofagasta
 Centro Español, Arica
 Estadio Español de Chiguayante
 Centro Español de Chillán
 Hogar Español de Chillán
 Sociedad Española de Beneficencia de Chillán
 Centro Español de Concepción
 Sociedad Española de Beneficencia de Concepción
 Colectividad Española, Coquimbo
 Corporación Unión Española de Coyhaique
 Centro Español de Curicó
 Club Deportivo Español de Curicó
 Estadio Español de Curicó
 Sociedad de Damas del Pilar de Curicó
 Sociedad Española de Beneficencia de Curicó
 Casino Español de Iquique
 Sociedad Española de Beneficencia, Iquique
 Sociedad Española de Beneficencia, Las Condes
 Estadio Español de Linares
 Sociedad Española de Beneficencia, Linares
 Centro Español de Los Andes
 Sociedad Española de Beneficencia, Los Andes
 Centro Español de Los Ángeles
 Club Deportivo Español de Osorno
 Sociedad Española de SS.MM. de Osorno
 Colectividad Valenciana de Chile Providencia
 Instituto Chileno de Cultura Hispánica, Providencia
 Centro Español de Puerto Montt
 Centro Español de Puerto Natales
 Sociedad Española de Punta Arenas
 Centro Español de Rancagua
 Corporación Club Español de Campo Reñaca-Viña
 Centro Cultural Español San Antonio
 Centro Español de San Fernando
 Sociedad Española de Beneficencia, San Fernando
 10a. Cía. de Bomberos "Bomba España", Santiago
 Camara Oficial Española de Comercio de Chile
 Centro Navarro de Chile, Santiago
 Círculo de Profesionales Hispánicos, Santiago
 Círculo Español, Santiago
 Colectividad Andaluza de Chile, Santiago
 Colectividad Asturiana de Chile, Santiago
 Colectividad Castellano-Leonesa de Chile, Santiago
 Colectividad Madrileña de Chile, Santiago
 Comité de Damas de A.I.E.CH., Santiago
 Confederación de Bombas Españolas en Chile, Santiago
 Coolectividad Aragonesa de Chile, Santiago
 Estadio Español de Las Condes
 Hogar Español, Santiago
 Lar Gallego, Santiago
 Sociedad Benéfica La Rioja, Santiago
 Sociedad Española de Socorros Mutuos y Beneficencia, Santiago
 Unión Española, Santiago
 Agrupación Winnipeg, Santiago
 Centre Català de Santiago de Xile, Santiago
 Centro Vasco, Santiago
 5a. Cía de Bomberos Bomba España de Talca
 Centro Español de Talca
 Club Deportivo Español de Talca
 Escuela Especial España, Talca
 Ropero Español de Talca
 Sociedad Española de Beneficencia de Talca
 4a. Cía. de Bomberos Bomba España, Temuco
 Centro Español de Temuco
 Sociedad Española de Beneficencia de Temuco
 Centro Español de Valdivia
 7a. Cía. de Bomberos Bomba España, Valparaíso
 Sociedad Española de Beneficencia, Valparaíso
 Club Unión Española Valparaíso, Viña del Mar
 Soc. de Beneficencia Damas Españolas Viña del Mar

See also 
 Chile–Spain relations

References

European Chilean
 
Spanish diaspora in South America
Chile